Trebišnica is a municipality located to the southeast of Široki Brijeg in Bosnia and Herzegovina.

See also 
 Hutovo Lake

References 

Populated places in Bosnia and Herzegovina